Cleveland, Painesville and Ashtabula Railroad may refer to:
Cleveland, Painesville and Ashtabula Railroad (1848–1869), predecessor of the Lake Shore and Michigan Southern Railway (New York Central system)
Cleveland, Painesville and Ashtabula Railroad (1879–1886), predecessor of the New York, Chicago and St. Louis Railroad (Nickel Plate)